Francesco Sarego (born August 1, 1939 in Cologna Veneta) was an Italian clergyman and bishop for the Roman Catholic Diocese of Goroka. He was appointed bishop in 1995. He retired in 2016.

See also
Catholic Church in Poland

References

External links

1939 births
Living people
Italian Roman Catholic bishops
Roman Catholic bishops of Goroka
People from the Province of Verona